Jang Sun-Jae (born 14 December 1984) is a South Korean former professional cyclist, who currently works as a directeur sportif for UCI Continental team . At the 2012 Summer Olympics, he competed in the Men's team pursuit for the national team.

Major results

2011
 1st Stage 3 Tour of China
2013
 5th Time trial, Asian Road Championships
2014
 2nd Road race, National Road Championships

References

External links

1984 births
Sportspeople from Gyeonggi Province
South Korean male cyclists
Living people
Olympic cyclists of South Korea
Cyclists at the 2012 Summer Olympics
South Korean track cyclists
Asian Games medalists in cycling
Cyclists at the 2006 Asian Games
Cyclists at the 2010 Asian Games
Cyclists at the 2014 Asian Games
Medalists at the 2006 Asian Games
Medalists at the 2010 Asian Games
Medalists at the 2014 Asian Games
Asian Games gold medalists for South Korea
Asian Games silver medalists for South Korea
Universiade medalists in cycling
Universiade bronze medalists for South Korea
20th-century South Korean people
21st-century South Korean people